The Sunshine State Conference women's basketball tournament is the annual conference women's basketball championship tournament for the NCAA Division II Sunshine State Conference. The tournament has been held annually since 1982. It is a single-elimination tournament and seeding is based on regular season records.

The tournament champion receives the conference's automatic bid to the NCAA Women's Division II Basketball Championship.

Florida Southern have the most titles, with twelve.

Results

Championship records

Embry–Riddle and Palm Beach Atlantic have not yet reached the championship game of the Sunshine State Conference tournament.
 Schools highlighted in pink are former members of the Sunshine State Conference

See also
NCAA Division II women's basketball tournament
Sunshine State Conference men's basketball tournament

References

NCAA Division II women's basketball conference tournaments
Tournament
Recurring sporting events established in 1982